The Wheeling, WV-OH Metropolitan Statistical Area, as defined by the United States Census Bureau, is an area consisting of two counties in the Northern Panhandle of West Virginia and one in eastern Ohio, anchored by the city of Wheeling. As of the 2010 census, the MSA had a population of 147,950. This represents a decline of 3.4% from the 2000 census population of 153,172.

Greater Wheeling is generally considered part of the Pittsburgh Tri-State area, as the area is heavily influenced by Pittsburgh media and transportation (notably Pittsburgh International Airport), as well as some Ohio media and sports influence.

Counties
Marshall County, West Virginia
Ohio County, West Virginia
Belmont County, Ohio

Communities
Places with more than 25,000 inhabitants
Wheeling, West Virginia (Principal city)
Places with 5,000 to 10,000 inhabitants
Martins Ferry, Ohio
Moundsville, West Virginia
St. Clairsville, Ohio

Places with 1,000 to 5,000 inhabitants
Barnesville, Ohio
Bellaire, Ohio
Benwood, West Virginia
Bethesda, Ohio
Bethlehem, West Virginia
Bridgeport, Ohio
Glen Dale, West Virginia
McMechen, West Virginia
Powhatan Point, Ohio
Shadyside, Ohio
West Liberty, West Virginia

Places with 500 to 1,000 inhabitants
Brookside, Ohio
Cameron, West Virginia
Flushing, Ohio
Neffs, Ohio (census-designated place)
Triadelphia, West Virginia
Yorkville, Ohio (partial
Places with less than 500 inhabitants
Belmont, Ohio
Clearview, West Virginia
Fairview, Ohio
Holloway, Ohio
Morristown, Ohio
Valley Grove, West Virginia
Wilson, Ohio

Unincorporated places
Alledonia, Ohio
Bannock, Ohio
Barton, Ohio
Betty Zane, West Virginia
Blaine, Ohio
Clinton, West Virginia
Colerain, Ohio
Eden, West Virginia
Elm Grove, West Virginia
Fairpoint, Ohio
Glencoe, Ohio
Greggsville, West Virginia

Jacobsburg, Ohio
Lafferty, Ohio
Lansing, Ohio
Maynard, Ohio
Mount Echo, West Virginia
Mount Olivet, West Virginia
Mozart, West Virginia
Natrium, West Virginia
Overbrook, West Virginia
Point Mills, West Virginia
Riverview, Ohio
Roneys Point, West Virginia
Sherrard, West Virginia
Warnock, Ohio
Warwood, West Virginia

Townships (Belmont County, Ohio)
Colerain
Flushing
Goshen
Kirkwood
Mead
Pease
Pultney
Richland
Smith
Somerset
Union
Warren
Washington
Wayne
Wheeling
York

Demographics

As of the census of 2000, there were 153,172 people, 62,249 households, and 41,506 families residing within the MSA. The racial makeup of the MSA was 95.62% White, 2.87% African American, 0.12% Native American, 0.44% Asian, 0.02% Pacific Islander, 0.14% from other races, and 0.79% from two or more races. Hispanic or Latino of any race were 0.48% of the population.

The median income for a household in the MSA was $30,513, and the median income for a family was $39,284. Males had a median income of $31,388 versus $20,307 for females. The per capita income for the MSA was $16,942.

See also
West Virginia census statistical areas
Ohio census statistical areas

References